Ludwig Janda (13 January 1919 – 22 August 1981) was a German football player and manager who played for SpVgg Fürth, 1860 Munich, AC Fiorentina and Novara Calcio.

In 1949, he transferred from 1860 Munich to Fiorentina for a fee of DM 30,000. He made his league debut on Boxing Day in a 0–0 draw against Palermo, becoming the first German to play in Serie A.

References

External links 
 
 Career statistics

1919 births
1981 deaths
Sportspeople from Fürth
German footballers
Association football forwards
Serie A players
SpVgg Greuther Fürth players
TSV 1860 Munich players
ACF Fiorentina players
Novara F.C. players
Viktoria Aschaffenburg managers
Karlsruher SC managers
Footballers from Bavaria
Luftwaffen-SV Hamburg players
German football managers
West German expatriate footballers
West German expatriate sportspeople in Italy
Expatriate footballers in Italy
West German footballers